The following is a list of the 50 municipalities (comuni) of the Metropolitan City of Florence, Tuscany, Italy.

List

See also 
List of municipalities of Italy

References 

 01
Metropolitan City of Florence
Florence